John Thomas Glenn (March 21, 1844March 14, 1899) was the 31st Mayor of Atlanta from 1889 to 1891, and the son of another Atlanta mayor, Luther Glenn, and like his father an attorney at law.

Biography
At the beginning of the American Civil War he was attending the University of Georgia where he received a Bachelor of Arts degree just before the institution was shut down in September 1863. He then served as a captain in the Confederate army.

After the war, on April 23, 1873, he married Helen Augusta Garrard (1850–1924) of Columbus, Georgia, where her father William Waters Garrard (18181866) practiced law. They had four children who lived to adulthood: Isa Garteray Urquhart Glenn (18741951), a novelist and contemporary of Ellen Glasgow; Garrard Glenn (18781949), noted attorney in New York City and subsequently professor of law at The University of Virginia; Helen Mildred Lewis Glenn (18851971), who married Theodore Gordon Ellyson of Richmond, Virginia, the first Naval aviator; and William Louis Glenn (1887–1950), an attorney in New York City.

Glenn practiced law in Atlanta, served as Atlanta's mayor, and died less than a decade later. Money from his estate was used to develop the Glenn Building at Spring St and Marietta which was commissioned by the George Fuller Company to coincide with the Spring Street Viaduct which they were building at the time. It was completed in 1923 and named for him.

References
History of the University of Georgia, Thomas Walter Reed, Imprint: Athens, Georgia : University of Georgia, ca. 1949, p.688
Glenn genealogy, derived from family records and letters, Helen Glenn Court, 2009

Notes

1845 births
1899 deaths
Mayors of Atlanta
University of Georgia alumni
Confederate States Army officers
19th-century American politicians